The 1994 Western Athletic Conference men's basketball tournament was held March 9–12 at the Delta Center in Salt Lake City, Utah.

 defeated  in the championship game, 73–66, to clinch their first WAC men's tournament championship.

The Rainbow Warriors, in turn, received an automatic bid to the 1994 NCAA tournament. They were joined in the tournament by the conference's regular season champions, New Mexico, who received an at-large bid to the tournament.

Format
No changes were made to the tournament format from the previous year. The top six teams received byes into the quarterfinal round, leaving the lowest four-seeded teams to play in the first round. Teams were seeded based on regular season conference records.

Bracket

References

WAC men's basketball tournament
Tournament
WAC men's basketball tournament
WAC men's basketball tournament